Alex Kang-chan Kam (born 23 May 1995) is a South Korean figure skater. He has represented South Korea at the 2018 Winter Olympics. As a single skater, he competed in the free skate at the 2012 Four Continents Championships. In 2015, he switched to pair skating, teaming up with Kim Kyu-eun in 2016.

Personal life
Alex Kang-chan Kam was born on 23 May 1995, in Queenstown, New Zealand. He is the elder brother of Korean ice dancer Richard Kang-in Kam.

Career

Single skating
In the 2011–12 season, Kam made his international senior debut at the 2011 NRW Trophy. He was assigned to the 2012 Four Continents Championships and finished 17th in his first ISU Championship appearance.

In the following year, Kam performed at the opening ceremony of the 2013 Special Olympics World Winter Games, titled "Dream of Snowman". 

In the 2013–14 season, Kam placed first in the junior men's event at the Asian Figure Skating Trophy, held in Bangkok, Thailand. It was his first medal at an ISU sanctioned competition.

Pairs
Following the 2014–15 season, Kam switched to pair skating with Kim Ye-ri. The duo won the Korean test competition for the ISU Junior Grand Prix (JGP) selection in August, and they were granted two assignments. In September, they made their international debut at the JGP in Colorado Springs, Colorado, placing 6th at the competition.

Kam and Kim Kyu-eun debuted internationally at the Sarajevo Open in early February 2016. The following season, they moved up to the senior level, placing 5th at the 2016 CS Autumn Classic International, and participated in the 2017 Four Continents Championships. During the 2017–2018 season, they participated in the 2018 Winter Olympics and in the 2018 World Figure Skating Championships.

Programs

With Kim Kyu-eun

With Kim Ye-ri

Single skating

Competitive highlights
CS: Challenger Series; JGP: Junior Grand Prix

Pairs with Kim Kyu-eun

Pairs with Kim Ye-ri

Single skating

Detailed results

Pairs with Kyu-eun Kim

with Kim Ye-ri

Single skating

References

External links
 
 
 
2013 Asian Figure Skating Trophy results

1995 births
Living people
People from Queenstown, New Zealand
South Korean male single skaters
South Korean male pair skaters
New Zealand people of South Korean descent
New Zealand emigrants to South Korea
Figure skaters at the 2018 Winter Olympics
Olympic figure skaters of South Korea
Figure skaters at the 2017 Asian Winter Games